Czech verbs can be classified (arranged in classes) in several ways. The verbal classes can be characterised in terms of their morphological properties. Verbs that belong to the same class typically accept the same range of suffixes (endings). This article concerns the morphological classification of the Czech verbs and the formation of their admissible forms (including, to some extent, bookish and archaic ones).

The first attempts to classify Czech verbs from the morphological point of view were made in the 16th century, for example in Matouš Benešovský's Grammatica Bohemica from 1577. Vavřinec Benedikt Nudožerský in his work Grammaticæ bohemicæ libri duo (1603) distinguished four classes according to the present indicative ending of the 1st person singular: . , III. , IV.

The Czech (and generally Slavic) verbs have two distinct stems: the present stem (used in forming present indicative, imperative and present transgressive) and the infinitive stem (infinitive, past and passive participles, past transgressive and verbal noun). Both stems are equally important and frequent, it means that there are two basic possibilities of systematic classification of the Czech (generally Slavic) verbs, based either on the present stems or on the infinitive stems. , III. , IV. ), the infinitive itself is derived from the present stem.

(no stem suffix), II. , III. , IV. This classification is very similar to the Doležal's one (though the class order is different).

The classification based on the present stem (e.g. August Schleicher, Formenlehre der kirchenslawischen Sprache, 1852, and esp. , III. , IV. , V.  (athematic consonantal present stems).

The system presented in this article is a system based on the Leskien's classification, adapted to the contemporary Czech language. The main differences are: a) the few athematic (and highly irregular) verbs are treated separately, b) the contracted  has moved from the class III to a new class V, c) the contracted  has moved from the class III to the class IV.

Class I (-e-)

The indicative present stem suffix is -e- (nes-e-š, nes-e, nes-e-me, nes-e-te) except the 1st person sing. (nes-u < *nes-ǫ) and the 3rd person plur. (nes-ou < †nes-ú < *nes-ǫ-tъ).

1) reduced imperative endings used in most cases: nes (but nesiž), nesme, neste
2) full imperative endings used if the root has no vowel: jmi, jměme, jměte
3) after some consonants the original iotation has been lost, e.g. třete < †třěte (so the modern imperative forms are undistinguishable from the present indicative forms)

The verbs of this class are divided in three groups according to the infinitive stem.

Group 1

The infinitive stem has no suffix and is equal to the primary stem that ends in a consonant (nes-, vez-, ved-, plet-, pek-, moh-, záb-).

nese – nesl – nésti
The primary stem ends in s or z (nes-, vez-).

1) for třesu ↔ třasu, etc. see Root vowel mutation (přísti)
2) hrýzti (hryze) is archaic („svědomí je hryze“, OCz „črvie mě hryzú“ = me vermes rodunt) → replaced by hryzati (hryže), obs. hrýzati (hrýže)

vede – vedl – vésti

The primary stem ends in d or t (ved-, plet-).
The infinitive ends in -sti (vésti < *ved-ti, plésti < *plet-ti).

1) růsti < *orst-ti: pass. part. rosten is not in use, there is a noun růst instead of rostení

peče – pekl ~ péci
 The primary stem ends in k or h (pek-, moh- < *mog-).
 The infinitive ends in -ci (péci < *pek-ti, moci < *mog-ti).

Common Czech uses the forms peču, pečou, peč, péct instead of peku, pekou, pec, péci and můžu, můžou, (-mož), moct instead of mohu, mohou, -moz, moci.

1) říci: the present stem forms řku, řčeš, rci, etc. are bookish ("…rci mi pravdu a víc nic, jest v Gilead balzám těchy…") → replaced by the present stem forms of -řeknouti (the infinitive only with a prefix): řeknu, řekneš, řekni and -řknouti (prefixed): -řknu, -řkneš, -řkni
2) arch. stříci (střiže) → replaced by stříhati (stříhá), -střihnouti (-střihne)
3) arch. žíci (žže) → replaced by other verbs: žhnouti (žhne), -žehnouti (-žehne), páliti (pálí)

zebe • zábl – zábsti
The primary stem ends in b or p (zeb-, tep-).
The infinitive ends in -s-ti (inserted s).

Note: In a similar conjugation, now obsolete, the primary stem ended in v, e.g. žíti (živ-e) < *živti (cf. živoucí, život) → replaced by žíti (ži-je), similarly pléti (plev-e) < *plevti (cf. plevel) → replaced by plíti (ple-je), see Class III.
The verbs of this type are obsolete except zábsti that is still in use.

1) arch. hřébsti or hřésti (hřebe) → replaced by pohřbívati (pohřbívá), pohřbíti (pohřbí)
2) arch. skúbsti or skústi (skube) → replaced by škubati (škube)
3) arch. dlúbsti (dlube) → replaced by dlabati (dlabe), dloubati (dloubá); still used in some dialects ("proč do toho dlubeš?")
4) arch. tépsti (tepe) → replaced by tepati (tepe)

Group 2

The infinitive stem has no distinctive suffix and ends in a vowel (ja-, tře-, mle-).

jme • jal – jíti (-níti) → jmouti
The original stem ended in m or n (*em-, *pen-, *dom-).
The present stems: jme- < *j-ьm-e-, pne- < *pьn-e-, dme- < *dъm-e-, etc.
The original infinitive: *j-ę-ti < *em-, *pę-ti < *pen-, *dǫ-ti < *dom-, etc.

N.B. The infinitive jmouti (see also Class II) is a newly created form as the original infinitive jíti (jme) < *jęti can be confused with the homonymous infinitive jíti (jde) < *iti. The original infinitive jíti (after some prefixes -níti) is mostly preserved in the prefixed verbs where the confusion is not an issue, e.g. vzíti (vezme) vs. vzejíti (vzejde), odníti (odejme) vs. odejíti (odejde), vyníti (vyjme) vs. vyjíti (vyjde), etc. However new infinitives like odejmouti, vyjmouti are also in use (vzíti is an exception).

1) The infinitive pnouti (see Class II) is a newly created form as the original infinitive píti (pne) < †pieti < *pęti can be confused with the homonymous infinitive píti (pije). In contemporary Czech the original infinitive (píti) is not in use.
2) The original verb míti (mne) < †mieti < *męti (the infinitive of which could be confused with the athematic verb míti < †jmieti) has been replaced by a newly created verb mnouti (mne) with identical present stem forms (see Class II).
3) The original verb †kléti (klne) < *klęti has been replaced by two newly created verbs: klnouti (klne) with identical present stem forms (see Class II) and klíti (kleje) with identical infinitive stem forms (see Class III). The new verbs have slightly different meaning.
4) The original verb †dúti (dme) < *dǫti has been replaced by two newly created verbs: dmouti (dme) with identical present stem forms (see Class II) and douti (duje) with identical infinitive stem forms (see Class III). The new verbs have different meaning ("hruď se dme", "vítr duje").

tře • třel – tříti
The original stem ended in r (*ter-).

mele • mlel – mlíti

The original stem ended in l (*mel-).

The forms mlen, mlena, etc. and mlení are less common.
There are no other verbs of this type except mlíti in contemporary Czech.

Group 3

The infinitive stem suffix is -a- (br-a-, zv-a-, maz-a-).

bere • bral – bráti

The present stem forms béřeš, beř, etc. are archaic.

zve • zval ~ zváti

The present stem forms zovu, zůveš, zovi, zova, etc. are archaic ("moudrost sama k sobě hloupé zůve").

maže • mazal ~ mazati

Class II (-ne-)

The indicative present stem suffix is -ne- (tisk-ne-š, tisk-ne, tisk-ne-me, tisk-ne-te) except the 1st person sing. (tisk-nu < *tisk-nǫ) and the 3rd person plur. (tisk-nou < †tisk-nú < *tisk-nǫ-tъ).

The verbs of this class are divided in two groups according to the primary stem ending.

Group 1

The primary stem ends in a consonant except syllabic r or l (tisk-, h-).

tiskne • tiskl – tisknouti

The forms tisknul, tisknut, (s)tisknuv, tisknutí are later created infinitive stem forms (formed regularly by using the suffix -nu-). Literary Czech prefers the original shorter forms (without the suffix -nu-) if they are in use (e.g. "dveře jsou zamčeny" is better than "dveře jsou zamknuty"). However some verbs use prevalently or exclusively the infinitive stem forms with the suffix -nu-. In some cases there is a difference in usage (e.g. "kniha je tištěna", but "ruka je tisknuta").

pne • pnul, pjal – pnouti

Group 2

The primary stem ends in a vowel or syllabic r or syllabic l (ply-, tr-, kl-).

plyne • plynul – plynouti

Class III (-je-)

The indicative present stem suffix is -je- (kry-je-š, kry-je, kry-je-me, kry-je-te) except the 1st person sing. (kry-ji < kry-ju < *kry-jǫ) and the 3rd person plur. (kry-jí < kry-jú < *kry-jǫ-tъ).

This class is divided in two groups according to the infinitive stem (1. kry-l, 2. dar-ova-l).

Group 1

The primary stem ends in a vowel (kry-, la-).

kryje • kryl ~ krýti

Common Czech uses the indicative present forms kryju and kryjou instead of kryji and kryjí.

laje • lál ~ láti

Common Czech uses the indicative present forms laju and lajou instead of laji and lají.

Group 2

The primary stem ends in a consonant except few verbs of foreign origin (e.g. kon-stru-uje-, kon-stru-ova-ti from Latin con-stru-ere).
The infinitive stem suffix is -ova- (dar-ova-l, dar-ova-ti).

daruje • daroval ~ darovati

Common Czech uses the forms daruju and darujou instead of daruji and darují.

Class IV (-í-)

The indicative present stem suffix is -í- (pros-í-m, pros-í-š, pros-í, pros-í-me, pros-í-te, pros-í) except the 3rd person plur. of sázeti and uměti (sázejí, umějí).

The verbs of this class are divided in two groups according to the infinitive stem (1. pros-i-l, 2. trp-ě-l/sáz-e-l).

Group 1

The infinitive stem suffix is -i- (pros-i-l, pros-i-ti).

prosí • prosil ~ prositi

1) The passive participles spasen, spasena, etc. and the verbal noun spasení are in fact forms of the archaic verb spásti (see Class I-1). The corresponding forms of spasiti would be spašen and spašení (that are not in use).

Group 2

The infinitive stem suffix is -ě- or -e- (trp-ě-l, trp-ě-ti, sáz-e-l, sáz-e-ti, um-ě-l, um-ě-ti).

trpí • trpěl ~ trpěti

Common Czech uses the 3rd person plur. indicative present form trpěj besides trpí.

sází • sázel ~ sázeti

Common Czech uses the 3rd person plur. indicative present forms sázej and sází besides sázejí.

umí • uměl ~ uměti

Common Czech uses the 3rd person plur. indicative present forms uměj and umí besides umějí.

Class V (-á-)

The indicative present stem suffix is -á- (děl-á-m, děl-á-š, děl-á, děl-á-me, děl-á-te) except the 3rd person plur. (děl-a-jí < †děl-a-jú < *dêl-a-jǫtъ). The infinitive stem suffix is -a- (děl-a-ti, tes-a-ti).

The verbs of this class are divided in two groups according to the original present stem suffix (1. *-a-je-, 2. *-je-).

Group 1

The indicative present stem suffix -á- is a contraction of the original suffix *-a-je- (děl-á- < *dêl-a-je-). The 3rd person plural present indicative form as well as the present transgressive forms remain uncontracted (děl-a-jí < †děl-a-jú < *dêl-a-jǫtъ).

dělá – dělal – dělati

The verbs of this type never create new forms by analogy with bráti (bere) or mazati (maže), Class I. Only the present stem forms with either the suffix -á- (contracted *-aje-) or -aj- (> -ej- in imperative) are possible.

 Some other verbs:
 dbáti impf. < †tbáti < *tъbati : dbám, dbej, dbaje — dbal, (nezane)dbav, dbán, dbání;
 zanedbati perf. : zanedbám, zanedbej, (zanedbávaje) — zanedbal, zanedbav, zanedbán, zanedbání;
 znáti impf. : znám, znej, znaje — znal, (po)znav, znán, (po-,vy-,do-,u-)znání;
 poznati perf. : poznám, poznej, (poznávaje) — poznal, poznav, poznán, poznání;
 poznávati impf. : poznávám, poznávej, poznávaje — poznával, (poznav), poznáván, poznávání
 nechati perf. : nechám, nechej (nech), (nechávaje) — nechal, nechav, nechán, nechání;
 nechávati impf. : nechávám, nechávej, nechávaje — nechával, (nechav), necháván, nechávání;
 obědvati denom. < *obêdъ : obědvám, obědvej, obědvaje — obědval, (po)obědvav, obědván, obědvání;
 hráti < †jhráti < *jьgrati : obs. ind. hrám, hráš … hrají (replaced by hraji, hraješ …, see láti, Class III), hrej, hraje — obs. part. hral, hrali (replaced by hrál, hráli, see láti, Class III), (se)hrav, hrán, hraní;
 -dolati perf. (o-,z-,u-) : -dolám, -dolej, (-dolávaje) — -dolal, -dolav, -dolán, -dolání;
 plácati (drncati, kecati, cucati, etc.) : plácám, plácej, plácaje — plácal, (u)plácav, plácán, plácání;

Group 2

The original present stem suffix was *-je-, added directly to the consonantal primary stem (teš-e- < *tes-je-) and not *-a-je-. The new present stem suffix -á- in tes-á- is an analogy to děl-á- (see dělati in Group 1). The verbs of this group have two sets of the present stem forms (original teše and new tesá).

tesá ∥ teše – tesal – tesati

 The primary stem ends in s or z (tes-, řez-).

• In the case of common verbs both the new present stem forms (tesá, tesej, etc.) and the original forms (teše, teš, etc.) are commonly in use (e.g. „češe si vlasy – česá ovoce“, „nakluše do práce – kůň klusá“, etc.).
• In the case of less common verbs the original present stem forms are mostly bookish or dialectal (e.g. „hlad tě opáše“, „břečka kyšíc proměňuje sloučenství“, „vykaše si rukávy“, etc.).
• The present indicative forms teši and teší (with endings -i < -u and -í < -ú) are bookish.
• The present transgressive forms are generally bookish, the forms teše, tešíc even more than tesaje, tesajíc.
• The infinitive stem forms are regular, formed according to děl-a-ti, maz-a-ti.

 Some other verbs:
 hlásati : hlásá, hláše; — plesati : plesá, pleše; — kysati : kysá, kyše; — pásati (se) : pásá, páše (páchá, páše is a different verb) — kasati : kasá, kaše — kolísati : kolísá, kolíše; — knísati (se) : knísá, kníše; — klouzati : klouzá, klouže.

hýbá ∥ hýbe – hýbal – hýbati

 The primary stem ends in b, p, v, f or m (hýb-, klep-, plav-, klof-, dřím-).

• The new present indicative forms (hýbá, etc.) and the original  forms (hýbe, etc.) are equally frequent.
• The original present indicative forms hýbi and hýbí (with endings -i < -u and -í < -ú) are obsolete.
• The original present transgressive forms (hýbě, hýbíc, etc.) are obsolete.
• The original imperative forms (hyb, hybte, etc.) are obsolete with some exceptions (e.g. syp, plav).
• The infinitive stem forms are regular, formed according to děl-a-ti, maz-a-ti.

 Some other verbs:
 škrabati (or škrábati) : škrabá, škrabe; – drápati : drápá, drápe; – chrápati : chrápá, chrápe; – dupati : dupá, dupe; – loupati : loupá, loupe; – rýpati : rýpá, rýpe; – štípati : štípá, štípe; – šlapati : šlapá, šlape; – chápati : chápá, chápe; – sápati : sápá, sápe; – skřípati : skřípá, skřípe; – šlapati : šlapá, šlape; – tápati : tápá, tápe; – dřímati : dřímá, dříme; – klamati : klamá, klame; – lámati : lámá, láme; – plavati : plavá, plave.

orá ∥ oře – oral – orati

The primary stem ends in r, l or n (or-, chrchl- ston-).

• The original present stem forms are generally less frequent, in some cases they are archaic or dialectal („nemajíce sobě zač chleba kúpiti, chodili po domích žebříce“, „proč se v tom šťářeš?“).
• The present indicative forms oři and oří (with endings -i < -u and -í < -ú) are bookish („polí svých oří“).
• The infinitive stem forms are regular, formed according to děl-a-ti, maz-a-ti.

 Some other verbs:
 škemrati : škemrá, škemře; – krákorati : krákorá, krákoře; – čabrati : čabrá, čabře; – šťárati : šťárá, šťáře; – babrati : babrá, babře; – (s)bírati : (s)bírá, (s)bíře; – (u)mírati : (u)mírá, (u)míře impf. (umře is perf.); – (za)vírati : (za)vírá, (za)víře impf. (zavře is perf.); – plápolati : plápolá, plápole; – bublati : bublá, buble; – huhlati : huhlá, huhle; – dudlati : dudlá, dudle; – brblati : brblá, brble; – frflati : frflá, frfle.

 Examples of using original forms:
 „ktož uoře (< óře) chtě bohat býti“ — „ten [kůň] vždy vůře“ — „zemí našich nevořeme“ — „jimi [voly] rolí oříce [Egypťané]“ — „ti, kdo pod rouškou horlivosti jiné káří“ — „co žehřeš proti snoubenci svému?“ — „žehří naň všickni“ — „Priamus proti Eneášovi žehře (= žehraje) takto vece“ — „písně svoje skuhřeme“ — „skuhřete, že zle zní naše řeč“ — „pyšný žebrák nic nevyžebře“ — „v zimě žebřú“ — „máš křídla, že krákořeš?“ — „kuře krákoře“ — „ženy jako slepice krákoří“ — „co se s tím babřeš?“ — „škemře o pochopení“ — „šťáře se v uchu“ — „koně kašlou, chrchlí“ — „ve škole všichni chrchlou“.

pyká ∥ pyče – pykal – pykati

The primary stem ends in k, h or ch (pyk-, strouh-, dých-).

• The original present stem forms are generally less frequent, in most cases they are bookish or dialectal (e.g. „stýště se duši mé v životě mém“, „nešlechetník nešlechetnost páše“, „matka hrůzou sotva dýše“, „zajíc v lese, a on rožeň strouže“ — „co se mne týče“ = as far as I am concerned (fixed expression) — „když jde pomalu, tak kulže“, „co to říčete?“, „malá furt fňuče“).
• In the case of the verb pykati the original present stem forms are very archaic (e.g. „jeho [Husovy] smrti velmi pyčí = litují“, „pyčtež mne panny a šlechetné panie = litujtež“, „minulých věcí nepyč = nelituj“).
• The infinitive stem forms are regular, formed according to děl-a-ti, maz-a-ti.

 Some other verbs:
 blýskati (se) : blýská, blýště (*-sk-je- > -ště-); — lákati : láká, láče; — kdákati : kdáká, kdáče; — krákati : kráká, kráče; — kvákati : kváká, kváče; — říkati : říká, říče; — smýkati : smýká, smýče; — stříkati : stříká, stříče; — soukati < súkati : souká, souče (dial. súče); — tleskati : tleská, tleště; — výskati : výská, výště; — získati perf. < †jískati < *jьskati (= hledati) : získá, zíště (†jíště = hledá); — kulhati : kulhá, kulže; — páchati : páchá, páše (pásá, páše is a different verb); — dial. brkati : brká, brče; — fňukati : fňuká, fňuče.

trestá ∥ tresce – trestal – trestati

The primary stem ends in t or d (trest-, hlod-).

• The original present stem forms are either archaic or dialectal (e.g. „padělání se tresce dle zákona“, „vězeň svou pověst šepce dál“, „žabí havěď v potoce pohřební píseň skřehoce“, „komoňové lační boje řehcí“ — „co tady léceš?“, „do úla jim lécou aj vosy“, „husy gagocú“).
• After losing iotation the imperative forms tresceme, trescete < †treskcěme, treskcěte and the present transgressive form tresce < †treskcě became homophonous with some indicative forms. Transition to the new forms has solved the problem.
• The infinitive stem forms are regular, formed according to děl-a-ti, maz-a-ti.

 Some other verbs:
 blekotati : blekotá, blekoce; — breptati : breptá, brepce; — drkotati : drkotá, drkoce; — hrkotati : hrkotá, hrkoce; — chechtati (se) : chechtá, chechce; — chlemtati : chlemtá, chlemce; — chrochtati : chrochtá, chrochce; — chytati : chytá, chyce (only dial.); — jektati : jektá, jekce; — klevetati : klevetá, klevece; — kloktati : kloktá, klokce; — klokotati : klokotá, klokoce; — klopotati : klopotá, klopoce; — kutati : kutá, kuce (only dial.); — lechtati : lechtá, lechce; — leptati : leptá, lepce; — létati : létá, léce; — lopotati : lopotá, lopoce; — mihotati : mihotá, mihoce; — řehotati : řehotá, řehoce; — skřehotati : skřehotá, skřehoce; — soptati : soptá, sopce; — štěbetati < †ščebetati : štěbetá, štěbece; — troskotati (se) : troskotá, troskoce; — třepotati : třepotá, třepoce; — hvízdati : hvízdá, hvíždě (*-zd-je- > -ždě-).

Athematic (irregular) verbs

The verbs with an athematic present stem (být, dáti, jísti, věděti) and míti.

býti, jsem

dáti, dám

jísti, jím

věděti, vím

míti, mám

The passive participles jměn, jmín, etc. are archaic ("blázen, mlče, za moudrého jmín bývá").

Comments, explanatory notes

Root vowel mutation (přísti) 

The verb přísti demonstrates a regular root vowel mutation (umlaut) in the roots in which the original Protoslavic root vowel was -ę- (nasal ẽ):

přísti < OCz přiesti (přadu, přědeš, přěde, ..., přadú) < *prʲad- < *pręd-
másti < OCz miesti (matu, měteš, měte, ..., matú) < *mʲat- < *męt-
třásti < OCz třiesti (třasu, třěseš, třěse, ..., třasú) < *trʲas- < *tręs-
zábsti < OCz ziebsti (zabu, zěbeš, zěbe, ..., zabú) < *zʲab- < *zęb-

However the regular pattern shown in the table has been eventually corrupted. New umlauted forms have been created by analogy, albeit there was no reason for umlaut (e.g. předu, předl, etc.). Nowadays both original and new forms are in use, with different, regionally dependent frequency. The following table shows the forms that are preferred by majority of the Czech speakers:

1) all forms in common use are umlauted; non-umlauted forms are used only sporadically („přadlena každý den přadla“)
2) no umlauted forms are used nowadays; the umlauted verbal noun změtení is bookish („babylonské změtení jazyků“)
3) the umlauted infinitive zíbst is regional as well as the non-umlauted form zabou („zabou mě nohy“)

Bibliography 

Czech grammar
Linguistic morphology
Czech verbs morphological classification